The Karchag Lhankarma is a catalog of the Buddhist texts held at the Lhankar palace of the Tibetan Empire. It was probably compiled in 824 CE. It is the only one of the three catalogues of Buddhist texts from the imperial period that is preserved in the Kanjur. It is also the oldest known catalogue of these texts.

References

9th century in Tibet
9th-century literature
824
Tibetan Empire
Tibetan literature
History of Buddhism in India
Religious literature
Cultural history
Translations
Historiography of India
Tibetan Buddhism